Mount Empung, together with Mount Lokon, is a twin volcano (2.2 km apart) in the North Sulawesi, Indonesia. Both rise above the Tondano plain and are among active volcanoes of Sulawesi. Mount Empung has a 400 m wide and 150 m deep crater at the summit that erupted in the eighteenth century.

References 

Stratovolcanoes of Indonesia
Mountains of Sulawesi
Volcanoes of Sulawesi
Active volcanoes of Indonesia
Landforms of North Sulawesi
Holocene stratovolcanoes